The ZS-Sports China International Challenger was a professional tennis tournament played on clay courts. It was part of the Association of Tennis Professionals (ATP) Challenger Tour. It was held annually in Qingdao, China from 2016 to 2017.

Past finals

Singles

Doubles

References

External links
 Tournament page on ATP website

ATP Challenger Tour
Clay court tennis tournaments
Tennis tournaments in China
2016 establishments in China
Sport in Qingdao
Annual events in China
Recurring sporting events established in 2016